The Billboard 200, published in Billboard magazine, is a weekly chart that ranks the 200 highest-selling music albums and EPs in the United States. Before Nielsen SoundScan began tracking sales in 1991, Billboard estimated the sales for the album charts from a representative sampling of record stores nationwide, which was gathered by telephone, fax or messenger service. The data was based on reports from record stores, who ranked the popularity of the best-selling records but did not provide an actual sales figures.

Chart history

See also
1986 in music
List of number-one albums (United States)

References

1986
1986 record charts